is a Japanese voice actor affiliated with VIMS talent agency. He won the Best Rookie Actor Award at the 12th Seiyu Awards.

Filmography

Anime series

Original video animation (OVA)

Original net animation (ONA)

Anime films

Video games

Drama CDs

Dubbing
Cinderella, James (James Corden)
Good Sam, Dr. Isan M. Shah (Omar Maskati)
High Strung Free Dance, Zander (Thomas Doherty)
Mid90s, Ray (Na-Kel Smith)
Peninsula, Captain Seo (Koo Kyo-hwan)
The Pembrokeshire Murders, Jack Wilkins (Steffan Cennydd)
Space Jam: A New Legacy, Darius James (Ceyair J. Wright)
The Wedding Invitation, Graham (Eoin Macken)

Publications

Photobooks

References

External links

1993 births
Living people
Male voice actors from Iwate Prefecture
Japanese male video game actors
Japanese male voice actors
21st-century Japanese male actors
Dramatic Stars members